See Hecataeus of Miletus for the earlier historian.
Hecataeus of Abdera or of Teos (c. 360 BC – c. 290 BC), was a Greek historian who flourished in the 4th century BC.

Life
Diodorus Siculus (i.46.8) tells us that Hecataeus visited Thebes in the times of Ptolemy I Soter and composed a history of Egypt. Diodorus supplies the comment that many additional Greeks went to and wrote about Egypt in the same period. The Suda gives him the nickname 'critic grammarian' and says that he lived in the time of the successors to Alexander.Diogenes Laërtius relates that Hecataeus was a student of Pyrrho.

Works
No complete works of Hecataeus have survived, and knowledge of his writing exists only in fragments located in various ancient Greek and Latin authors' works. Fourteen fragments survive, most of which concern religion. Eight fragments are from his book about the Hyperboreans, the mythical people of the far north who reflect the Indian traditions about Uttarakuru. Six fragments survive from his Aegyptiaca and regard Egyptian philosophy, priests, gods, sanctuaries, Moses, wine, and which makes mention of Clearchus and the gymnosophists. Hecataeus wrote the work Aegyptiaca or On the Egyptians (the same title of Manetho's later work), both suggestions are based on known titles of other ethnographic works, an account of Egypt's customs, beliefs and geography, and the single largest fragment from this lost work is held to be Diodorus' account of the Ramesseum, tomb of Osymandyas (i.47-50). According to Montanari, in his work, Egypt is "strongly idealised", depicted as a country "exemplary in its customs and political institutions". His digression on the Jews in Aegyptiaca was the first mention of them in Greek literature. It was subsequently paraphrased in Diodorus Siculus 40.3.8.

Diodorus Siculus' ethnography of Egypt (Bibliotheca historica, Book I) represents by far the largest number of fragments. Diodorus mostly paraphrases Hecataeus, thus it is difficult to extract Hecataeus' actual writings (as in Karl Wilhelm Ludwig Müller's Fragmenta Historicorum Graecorum). Diodorus (ii.47.1-2) and Apollonius of Rhodes tell of another work by Hecataeus, On the Hyperboreans. Clement of Alexandria (Stromata 5.113) cites a work titled "On Abraham and the Egyptians". According to Clement, Hecataeus was the source for verses of Sophocles that praise monotheism and condemn idolatry. The major fragment explicitly attributed to Hecataeus in Jewish and Christian literature is found in Josephus (Apion 1.183-205) in which Josephus argues that learned Greeks (Apion 1.175) and Aristotle (Apion 1.176-82) admired the Jews. The work is considered spurious by some; However Pucci Ben Zeev, in surveying scholarship on this matter, finds reasons to grant core elements of authenticity in the absence of clear evidence to the contrary.

According to the 10th century Byzantine encyclopedia the Suda, Hecataeus wrote a treatise on Homer and Hesiod, entitled On the Poetry of Homer and Hesiod (Περὶ τῆς ποιήσεως Ὁμήρου καὶ Ἡσιόδου); nothing of this work survives, however, and it is mentioned by no other ancient source.

References

Citations

Bibliography 
 .
 .
 .
 .
 .

Further reading 
.

External links
 Fragments of Hecataeus in  & 

Hellenistic-era historians
Abderites
4th-century BC historians
Ancient Greeks in Egypt
Year of birth unknown
Year of death unknown